Santa vs. the Snowman is a 1997 American computer-animated Christmas comedy television special created by Steve Oedekerk and produced by O Entertainment. It originally aired on ABC on December 12, 1997, following The Online Adventures of Ozzie the Elf.

The special was voiced by Jonathan Winters, Ben Stein, Victoria Jackson, Mark DeCarlo and David Floyd, and narrated by Don LaFontaine.

Relations to other films, like a scene of ice-made AT-ST's, mostly resembling the ones from The Empire Strikes Back appear throughout.

In 2002, the special was released in IMAX 3D as Santa vs. the Snowman 3D, with new scenes at the beginning and end of the film.

Plot
A lonely Snowman has no friends and never learned to speak because nobody was around. Instead, he plays his flute for the stars every night. But one particular night, the stars answer back, a flash of light zooms past the Snowman and shatters his flute. Consumed with curiosity, the Snowman sets off to find out what created the mysterious light. Eventually, the Snowman finds himself at Santa's Village. The Snowman enters a toy workshop, where elves are making toys. Another elf comes into the workshop with its owner, Santa Claus. While Santa is chatting with his elves, who praise him highly, the Snowman finds a red and gold flute in the workshop. After grabbing the flute, an alarm goes off. The Snowman retreats, but Santa sends some of his elves to retrieve the flute. While being chased, the Snowman drops the flute, and hides from the elves by jumping off a cliff. He grabs an icicle stalactite, waiting for them to leave. After the elves retrieve the flute and return to the village, the Snowman heads home.

The Snowman cannot stop thinking about Santa and his wonderful workshop. It seems that Santa has a marvelous home, many friends, plenty of toys, and is loved by everybody, but he wouldn't let the Snowman have the flute. The Snowman imagines himself as Santa, giving out toys, loved by everyone. At that moment, the Snowman thinks, "Why should Santa keep all that love, good tidings, and friendship for himself? That didn't seem fair. Maybe, it's time someone else got to be Santa?" With that, the Snowman forms a plan to take Santa's spot. The Snowman sneaks onto a guided village train tour, where he takes pictures with a camera disguised as an ice cream cone. The Snowman gets off the train and admires Santa's sleigh, where he is noticed and kicked out. The Snowman then makes various equipment for invading the workshop, and snowman minions to help him, becoming a much more devious Snowman.

The Snowman and his minions invade Santa's Village, but Santa sends his elves to fight back, in a chaotic battle. The elves attempt to melt and blow up the snowmen while the snowmen spew snowballs at the elves. Since Christmas is only hours away, Santa decides to help his elves end the conflict, and enters the battle in a large Nutcracker mech. The Snowman unleashes a snow monster, but Santa's mech defeats the monster by shrinking it with a heat gun. Just when it seems that Snowman is about to surrender, many more of his minions appear, greatly outnumbering Santa's forces. With that, Santa and his elves are imprisoned in an ice cage, and the Snowman leaves to deliver toys.

The Snowman, feeling wonderful because everyone will soon love him, soars above the rooftops in a snow replica of Santa's sleigh, while his minions act as his reindeer. The Snowman arrives at a little girl's house and enters through the front door. An elf named Flippy frees Santa and his elves, and Santa heads to the Snowman's location. The Snowman gives the girl an ice doll, but the doll shatters, and his other toys melted near the fireplace. Santa arrives and gives the girl a real doll. Instead of punishing the Snowman, Santa, knowing the Snowman regrets what he did, gives him the flute he attempted to steal. Santa explains to the Snowman that the flute always belonged to him because Santa accidentally broke the other flute, and that he could've given joy to people on his own, without taking over Santa's operations. As they are about to part ways, the Snowman discovers that his sleigh and his minions had melted from the heat of the little girl's chimney. Santa offers the Snowman a ride back home, and they become friends.

Cast
Jonathan Winters as Santa Claus
Don LaFontaine as the Narrator
Ben Stein as Spunky the Elf
Victoria Jackson as Elves
Mark DeCarlo as Flippy the Elf and Security Elf
David Floyd as Bundis the Elf
Jean DeLisle as Kids
John A. Davis as Elves
Keith Alcorn as Charlie the Elf
Steve Oedekerk as Sno' Hellton
Dee Bradley Baker as Elves

Release
Originally made as a television special in December 1997, the film was later presented in IMAX 3D theaters during the November 2002–November 2006 holiday seasons. Three bonus features included an interactive game narrated by Oedekerk, but no featurette or commentary.

Santa vs. the Snowman 3D was released on 3D-DVD, including 4 pairs of 3D glasses, on October 12, 2004, by Universal Studios Home Video. It offered optional 2D or 3D viewing. The film grossed $10.1M according to Rotten Tomatoes.

Reception
The film received a rating of 81% from Rotten Tomatoes, making it Jonathan Winters' highest short film review.

Awards
In 2003, Santa vs. the Snowman was awarded a Golden Reel Award for Best Sound Editing in Special Venue Film.

Sound editors:

 Tim Archer (supervising sound editor/ re-recording mixer)
 Brian Eimer (supervising sound editor/ re-recording mixer)
 Carl Lenox (music editor)
 Dan Shattuck (sound editor)
 Grant McAlpine (sound editor)
 Regan Ramos (sound editor)

See also
 List of Christmas films
 Santa Claus in film

References

External links
 

1997 animated films
1997 films
1997 television specials
2002 films
2002 computer-animated films
2002 3D films
1990s American animated films
1990s American television specials
1990s animated television specials
2000s American animated films
2000s animated short films
American Christmas films
Computer-animated short films
DNA Productions films
Films scored by Harvey Cohen
Films directed by John A. Davis
IMAX short films
Santa Claus in film
Films with screenplays by John A. Davis
Films with screenplays by Steve Oedekerk
American computer-animated films
3D animated short films